Meshach Wade (born 23 January 1973) is a retired Bermudian football player.

Club career
Wade played two seasons for Hereford United, alongside compatriot Kentoine Jennings, in the English Football League before returning to PHC Zebras in Bermuda in 1993. He had a few seasons in US Indoor soccer with Harrisburg Heat alongside another Bermudian, David Bascome, and then played for Southampton Rangers and became player/coach at Hamilton Parish and player/coach at Dandy Town Hornets F.C. in summer 2008.

He was replaced as Hornets' coach after suffering career-threatening injuries in a bike accident in February 2009.

International career
A national team stalwart for almost 20 years, Wade made his debut for Bermuda in the sensational 1991 friendly win against the United States and has earned over 30 caps, scoring 3 goals. He has represented his country in 18 FIFA World Cup qualification matches.

His final international match was a June 2008 World Cup qualification match against Trinidad and Tobago.

International goals
Scores and results list Bermuda's goal tally first.

References

External links
 

1973 births
Living people
People from Smith's Parish
Association football midfielders
Bermudian footballers
Bermuda international footballers
PHC Zebras players
Hereford United F.C. players
Harrisburg Heat players
Dandy Town Hornets F.C. players
Bermudian expatriate footballers
Expatriate footballers in England
Expatriate soccer players in the United States
Bermudian football managers
BAA Wanderers F.C. players